The tenth series of Geordie Shore, a British television programme based in Newcastle upon Tyne was confirmed on 1 November 2014, and began airing on 7 April 2015. This will be the first series not to include original cast member Vicky Pattison after she departed at the end of the previous series. Ahead of the series it was confirmed that new cast members Chloe Ferry and Nathan Henry had joined the show.

Cast
Aaron Chalmers
Charlotte-Letitia Crosby
Chloe Ferry
Gary Beadle
Holly Hagan
James Tindale
Kyle Christie
Marnie Simpson
Nathan Henry
Scott Timlin

Duration of cast 

 = Cast member is featured in this episode.
 = Cast member arrives in the house.
 = Cast member voluntarily leaves the house.
 = Cast member leaves and returns to the house in the same episode.
 = Cast member returns to the house.
 = Cast member leaves the series.
 = Cast member does not feature in this episode.
 = Cast member is not officially a cast member in this episode.

Episodes

Ratings

References

2015 British television seasons
Series 10